Hypatima trachyspila is a moth in the family Gelechiidae. It was described by Edward Meyrick in 1933. It is found in Sierra Leone.

References

Hypatima
Taxa named by Edward Meyrick
Moths described in 1933